The Vitiligo Research Foundation (VRF) is a 501(c)(3) non-profit organization focused on the human skin disease, vitiligo.

Main initiatives
Initiatives established or supported by the VRF include a Vitiligo BioBank and CloudBank, sponsorship of World Vitiligo Day, a World Vitiligo Map of vitiligo research centers, patient support groups, and related healthcare providers, and an initiative to facilitate crowdfunding of small related research efforts.

History, governance, and funding

The Vitiligo Research Foundation was founded in 2010 by Russian entrepreneur Dmitry Aksenov, whose daughter suffers from vitiligo, after he concluded that there was a lack of research into the disease. It is managed by a small team of permanent staff, and led by a Board of Directors (Torello Lotti, Professor, Dermatology Division, Marconi University, chair). A Scientific Advisory Board advises on scientific issues. The VRF's Public Advisory Board advises the Foundation on aspects of living with vitiligo and how best to support those affected by the condition; it includes members such as reporter and author Lee Thomas.  The VRF is entirely reliant on public donations, and receives no funding from governments or the pharmaceutical industry.

References

External links
 

Medical research organizations